Hagsätra is a quarter in Söderort, the southern part of Stockholm Municipality, Sweden.  It borders with the quarters of Älvsjö, Örby and Rågsved in Stockholm, as well as  Stuvsta in neighboring  Huddinge Municipality.  Hagsätra covers an area of 420 acres (1.7 km² or 0.66 mi2) and has a population of around 7,800.

This area previously belonged to Älvsjö gård manor but was incorporated into Stockholm in 1930. But it wasn't until 1957 Hagsätra started expanding with modern houses and architecture. Hagsätra has a marketplace known as Hagsätra torg.  The Hagsätra metro station is the southern terminus on Line 19 of Stockholm's Metro system.

Districts of Stockholm